Julio Londoño Paredes (born 10 July 1938) is a retired Colombian Army Lieutenant Colonel and diplomat. He has served as Colombia's Minister or Foreign Affairs, Permanent Representative of Colombia to the United Nations, Permanent Representative of Colombia to the Organization of American States, and Ambassador of Colombia to Panama, and Cuba. During his Ambassadorship in Cuba he was commissioned to represent Colombia at the International Court of Justice to protect sovereign claims on the Archipelago of San Andrés, Providencia and Santa Catalina by Nicaragua.

Personal life
Born on 10 July 1938 in Bogotá, Colombia to Julio Londoño Londoño and Isabel Paredes Manrique. He married Constanza Fajardo Solano with whom he had three children: Andrés, Isabel Cristina and Daniel Eduardo.

Selected works

References

1938 births
Living people
People from Bogotá
Colombian military personnel
Ambassadors of Colombia to Cuba
Ambassadors of Colombia to Panama
Permanent Representatives of Colombia to the United Nations
Permanent Representatives of Colombia to the Organization of American States